Wolf is a given name and a surname. It is common among Germanic-speaking peoples, alongside variants such as Wulf. Names which translate to English "wolf" are also common among other nations, including many Native American peoples within the current or former extent of the habitat of the grey wolf (essentially all of North America).

Geographical distribution
As of 2014, 53.2% of all known bearers of the surname Wolf were residents of Germany (frequency 1:413), 27.4% of the United States (1:3,608), 3.9% of Austria (1:596), 2.5% of Brazil (1:21,995), 1.4% of Switzerland (1:1,622), 1.2% of the Netherlands (1:3,735) and 1.0% of France (1:17,534).

In Germany, the frequency of the surname was higher than national average (1:413) in the following states:
 Saxony (1:214)
 Rhineland-Palatinate (1:292)
 Hesse (1:297)
 Thuringia (1:297)
 Bavaria (1:337)
 Brandenburg (1:365)
 Baden-Württemberg (1:368)
 Saxony-Anhalt (1:394)

Given name
Wolf Biermann (born 1936), German singer-songwriter
Wolf Blitzer (born 1948), American journalist
Wolf Burchard, British-German art historian
Wolf Heckmann (1929–2006), German journalist
Wolf Henzler (born 1975), German racing driver
Wolf Hilbertz (1938–2007), German architect
Wolf Hoffmann (born 1959), German guitarist
Wolf Howard (born 1968), English artist and musician
Wolf Kahler (born 1946), German actor
Wolf Kahn (born 1927), German-born American painter
Wolf Karni (1911–1996), Finnish football referee
Wolf Larson (born 1959), Canadian actor
Wolf Mail (born 1972), Canadian guitarist
Wolf Mankowitz (1924–1988), English writer
Wolf Ruvinskis (1921–1999), Mexican actor
Wolf Curt von Schierbrand (1807–1888), German zoologist
Wolf Van Halen (born 1991), American bassist
Wolf V. Vishniac (1922–1973), American biologist
Wolf Wigo (born 1973), American water polo player and coach

Surname
Aaron Wolf (disambiguation), several people
Abraham Wolf (1876–1948), Russian-born English historian, writer, philosopher, and rabbi
Alfred Wolf (disambiguation), several people
Alice Wolf (1933–2023), American politician
Aliya Wolf (born 1975), American model
Allan Wolf, American author
Amnon Wolf (born 1971), Israeli actor and dubber
Ann Wolf (disambiguation), several people
Armin Wolf (born 1966), Austrian journalist and television anchor
Benno Wolf (1871–1943), German judge, speleologist, and holocaust victim
Carrie Wolf, American officer and judge advocate
Charles Wolf (disambiguation), several people
Christa Wolf (1929–2011), German writer
Christie Wolf (born 1966), American bodybuilder and wrestler
Christopher Wolf (born 1959), American lawyer
Christopher Howard Wolf (born 1979), American game and comic book creator
Clarence Wolf (1860–1937), American banker, businessman, and politician
Dale E. Wolf (born 1924), American politician
Daniel James Wolf (born 1961), American music composer and scholar
David Wolf (disambiguation), several people
Dick Wolf (born 1946), American television producer
Diego Wolf, Argentine water polo player
Dragutin Wolf (1866–1927), Croatian industrialist
Edwin Wolf (1855–1934), American manufacturer and banker
Eli Wolf (born 1997), American football player
Emil Wolf (1922–2018), American physicist  
Eric Wolf (1923–1999), American anthropologist
Ernst Wilhelm Wolf (1735–1792), German composer
Ethan Wolf (born 1995), American football player
Frank Wolf (disambiguation), several people
František Wolf (1904–1989), Czech mathematician
Franz Wolf (disambiguation), several people
Fred Wolf (disambiguation), several people
Friedrich Wolf (disambiguation), several people
Gary Wolf (disambiguation), several people
Guido Wolf (disambiguation), several people
Gusti Wolf (1912–2007), Austrian actor
Hanna Wolf (1908–1999), East German historian and politician
Hannes Wolf (disambiguation), several people
Hanns Wolf (1894–1968), German composer and pianist
Harry Wolf (disambiguation), several people
Heinrich Wolf (1875–1943), Austrian chess player
Henry Wolf (disambiguation), several people
Hugo Wolf (1860–1903), Austrian composer
Jack Keil Wolf (1935–2011), American computer scientist
James Wolf (disambiguation), several people
Jenny Wolf (born 1979), German ice speed skater
Jeremy Wolf (born 1993), American-Israeli baseball player 
Jim Wolf (born 1969), American baseball umpire
Jimmy Wolf (1862–1903), American baseball player
J. J. Wolf (born 1998), American tennis player
Joan Wolf (born 1951), American writer
Joe Wolf (born 1964), American basketball player
Johann Christoph Wolf (1683–1739), German Hebraist and book collector
John Wolf (disambiguation), several people
Joseph Wolf (1820–1899), German natural history illustrator
Josh Wolf (disambiguation), several people
Julia Wolf, British mathematician
Kate Wolf (1942–1986), American folk singer and songwriter
Katie Wolf (1925–2020), American politician
Kati Wolf (born 1974), Hungarian singer
Konrad Wolf (1925–1982), German film director
Lana Wolf (born 1975), Dutch rock singer and radio producer
Laurent Wolf (born 1971), French music producer
Linda Wolf (born 1950), American-born photographer and writer
Lucien Wolf (1857–1930), English journalist
Marek Wolf, Czech astronomer
Marilyn Wolf, American computer engineer
Marius Wolf (born 1995), German footballer
Markus Wolf (1923–2006), East German intelligence head
Mary Wolf (disambiguation), several people
Max Wolf (1863–1932), German astronomer
Michael Wolf (disambiguation), several people
Michelle Wolf, American comedian, writer, producer, and television host
Milton A. Wolf (1924–2005), American real estate developer and diplomat
Naomi Wolf (born 1962), American author, journalist, and former political advisor to Al Gore and Bill Clinton
Patrick Wolf (disambiguation), several people
Peter Wolf (disambiguation), several people
Randy Wolf (born 1976), American baseball player
Raymond Wolf (1904–1979), American athlete and coach
Remi Wolf (born 1996), American musician
Robert Wolf (disambiguation), several people
Ron Wolf (born 1938), American football general manager
Rudolf Wolf (1816–1893), Swiss astronomer and mathematician
Scott Wolf (disambiguation), several people
Sebastian Wolf (disambiguation), several people
Sherry Wolf (born 1949), American surrealist painter and designer
Shmuel Wolf (1934–2019), Hungarian-born Israeli actor
Simon Wolf (1826–1923), American businessman, lawyer, diplomat and Jewish activist
Slavko Wolf (1862–1936), Croatian lawyer, chess player and writer
Steven Wolf (disambiguation), several people, includes Stephen
Susan Wolf (born 1952), American moral philosopher
Thomas Wolf (disambiguation), several people, includes Thom and Tom
Wally Wolf (1930–1997), American swimmer, water polo player, and Olympic champion
Wally Wolf (baseball) (1942–2020), American baseball player
Walter Wolf (disambiguation), several people
Warner Wolf (born 1937), American television and radio sports broadcaster
Warren Wolf (disambiguation), several people
Wilhelm Wolf (disambiguation), several people
William Wolf (disambiguation), several people
Wolfgang Wolf (born 1957), German soccer player and coach
Yoni Wolf (born 1979), American alternative hip-hop/indie rock artist, best known for WHY? project

Nickname or stage name
Enzo Coloni, Italian race car driver and founder of the Scuderia Coloni racing team, nicknamed "the wolf"
Gustav Wagner (1911–1980), Austrian SS officer at Sobibór extermination camp
Michael Van Wijk, known by the pseudonym Wolf on the television series Gladiators

Fictional characters
Wolf Larsen, in the 1904 novel The Sea-Wolf by Jack London
Father Wolf, in the 1894 novel The Jungle Book by Rudyard Kipling
Ralph Wolf, in a series of animated cartoons from Looney Tunes and Merrie Melodies
Wolf, in the 1984 novel The Talisman by Stephen King and Peter Straub
The Wolf, the name by which Ezra is known in The Night Angel Trilogy fantasy series
Wolf, codename for a character in the novel Stormbreaker by Anthony Horowitz
Wolf, the nickname given to Ze'ev Kesley of The Lunar Chronicles fantasy novel series
Bigby Wolf, in the comic book series Fables
Wolf (The 10th Kingdom), on the television show The 10th Kingdom
Wolf, from Fire Emblem: Shadow Dragon and the Blade of Light, Fire Emblem: Mystery of the Emblem, and their respective remakes
Wolf O'Donnell, in the Star Fox series of video games
Claudia Wolf, in the Silent Hill video game series
Crying Wolf, in the Metal Gear video game series
Sniper Wolf, in the Metal Gear video game series
Wolf Hawkfield, in the Virtua Fighter video game series
Wolf, street name for a character in Need for Speed: Carbon
Marcus Wolf, from the film Deep Impact
Marty Wolf, a film producer and the main antagonist of Big Fat Liar
Wolf, a main character in the streaming television series Future Man
Wolf Stoller, a German banker from Herman Wouk's The Winds of War book and television miniseries
Wolf, the protagonist of Sekiro: Shadows Die Twice
Wolf, a main character in the animated television series Kipo and the Age of Wonderbeasts
Wolf Edmunds, a deceased astronaut in the 2014 science fiction film Interstellar

See also
Little Wolf (c. 1820 – 1904), Cheyenne war leader
Joseph Lonewolf (born 1932), Pueblo potter
Minnie Spotted-Wolf (1923–1988), first female Native American Marine
Mountain Wolf Woman (1884–1960), Ho-Chunk woman and biographical subject
Myron Wolf Child (1983–2007), Canadian politician and activist
Wolf Robe (1838–1910), Cheyenne chief
Wolfe (given name)
Wolfe (surname)
Wolffe, a surname
Woolf (surname)
Woolf (given name)
Woolfe (surname)
Wulf, a surname
Zev Wolf, Jewish double-name with both parts having the same meaning in Hebrew (Ze'ev, Zev) and Yiddish

References

German masculine given names
Jewish given names
German-language surnames
Jewish surnames
Surnames from given names